Ten of Songs is an album by the folk musician Robin Williamson, released in 1988.

Critical reception
Renaldo Migaldi, in the Chicago Reader, called the album "perhaps the most convincing example I’ve heard of bringing traditional Celtic music into today’s world without trashing its roots or turning it into some kind of bastardized rock and roll thing."

Track listing 
All songs written by Robin Williamson.
Ancient Song
Lammas
Political Lies
Scotland Yet
Skull and Nettlework
The Barley
Here to Burn
Verses at Ellesmere
Innocent Love
Verses at Powis

References

1988 albums
Robin Williamson albums